Mummel River, a watercourse of the Manning River catchment, is located in the Northern Tablelands and Mid North Coast districts of New South Wales, Australia.

Course and features
Mummel River rises on the eastern slopes of the Great Dividing Range, below Mount Sugarloaf, southeast of Walcha and flows generally south by west, southeast, and then south southeast, joined by one minor tributary, before reaching its confluence with the Cooplacurripa River, north of Giro, northwest of Taree. The river descends  over its  course. There are two fault lines that are near the path of the river.

See also

 Rivers of New South Wales
 List of rivers of New South Wales (L–Z)
 List of rivers of Australia

References

External links
 

Rivers of New South Wales
Northern Tablelands
Mid North Coast
Mid-Coast Council